Sleeping Giant (also known as the Blue Hills and Mount Carmel), (Hobbomock in Quinnipiac), is a rugged traprock mountain with a high point of , located  north of New Haven, Connecticut. A prominent landscape feature visible for miles, the Sleeping Giant receives its name from its anthropomorphic resemblance to a slumbering human figure as seen from either the north or south. The Giant is known for its expansive clifftop vistas, rugged topography, and microclimate ecosystems. Most of the Giant is located within Sleeping Giant State Park. Quinnipiac University is located at Mount Carmel's foot in Hamden.

Geography
The Giant's profile features distinct "head," "chin," "chest," "hip," "knee," and "feet" sections topographically represented by traprock outcrops and ridge crests. The highest point is the Left Hip, followed by the Chest, and the Left Knee and Right Leg,  each, and so on. The Giant's Head, is marked by a  cliff. A stone observation tower located on the Left Hip, built by the Works Progress Administration in the 1930s, offers 360° views of the surrounding Mill and Quinnipiac River valleys. An old rock quarry, closed since 1933 and now part of the state park, has left scars on the Giant's Head. 
 
It is part of the narrow, linear Metacomet Ridge that extends from Long Island Sound north through the Connecticut River Valley of Massachusetts to the Vermont border. The Metacomet Ridge extends west and south from Sleeping Giant as Rocky Top and West Rock Ridge. The west side of Sleeping Giant drains into the Mill River thence to New Haven Harbor and Long Island Sound; the east side into the Quinnipiac River, thence to New Haven Harbor and Long Island Sound.

Geology

Sleeping Giant, a fault-block ridge that formed 200 million years ago during the Triassic and Jurassic periods, is composed of traprock, also known as basalt, an extrusive volcanic rock. Minor earthquakes have also been measured by seismographs and reported by residents.  Basalt is a dark colored rock, but the iron within it weathers to a rusty brown when exposed to the air, lending the ledges a distinct reddish appearance. Basalt frequently breaks into octagonal and pentagonal columns, creating a unique "postpile" appearance. Huge slopes made of fractured basalt scree are visible beneath many of the ledges of Sleeping Giant. The basalt cliffs are the product of several massive lava flows hundreds of feet deep that welled up in faults created by the rifting apart of North America from Eurasia and Africa. These basalt floods of lava happened over a period of 20 million years. Erosion occurring between the eruptions deposited deep layers of sediment between the lava flows, which eventually lithified into sedimentary rock. The resulting "layer cake" of basalt and sedimentary sheets eventually faulted and tilted upward. Subsequent erosion wore away the weaker sedimentary layers at a faster rate than the basalt layers, leaving the abruptly tilted edges of the basalt sheets exposed, creating the distinct linear ridge and dramatic cliff faces visible today. One way to imagine this is to picture a layer cake tilted slightly up with some of the frosting (the sedimentary layer) removed in between.

Ecosystem
Sleeping Giant hosts a combination of microclimates unusual in New England. Dry, hot upper ridges support oak savannas, often dominated by chestnut oak and a variety of understory grasses and ferns. Eastern red cedar, a dry-loving species, clings to the barren edges of cliffs. Lower eastern slopes tend to support oak-hickory forest species common in the surrounding lowlands. Narrow ravines crowded with eastern hemlock block sunlight, creating damp, cooler growing conditions with associated cooler climate plant species. Talus slopes are especially rich in nutrients and support a number of calcium-loving plants uncommon in eastern Connecticut. Because the ridge generates such varied terrain, it is the home of several plant and animal species that are state-listed or globally rare. Sleeping Giant is also an important seasonal raptor migration path.

Mythology
According to Native Americans of the Quinnipiac Tribe, the giant stone spirit Hobbomock (or Hobomock), a prominent wicked figure in many stories (see Pocumtuck Ridge and Quinnipiac), became enraged about the mistreatment of his people and stamped his foot down in anger, diverting the course of the Connecticut River (where the river suddenly swings east in Middletown, Connecticut after several hundred miles of running due south). To prevent him from wreaking such havoc in the future, the good spirit Keitan cast a spell on Hobbomock to sleep forever as the prominent man-like form of the Sleeping Giant.

In the title story of Eleanor Estes's 1948 collection, The Sleeping Giant and Other Stories, the Giant decides to get up and leave. The Native American legend is retold (with a few liberties) by Jason J. Marchi in his illustrated children's book The Legend of Hobbomock: The Sleeping Giant, published in 2015.

History

During the mid-19th century, spurred by the painters of the Hudson River School and transcendentalist philosophers such as Ralph Waldo Emerson and Henry David Thoreau, an interest in mountains as a respite from industrialization and urbanization took hold in New England. Summer cottages were built on the Sleeping Giant and many other locations on the Metacomet Ridge. In 1888, John H. Dickerman built a carriage road on the Giant and opened what he called Blue Hills Park. He held picnics with ice cream on the ledges for local residents.

Conservation of the Giant began in 1924 with the creation of the Sleeping Giant Park Association (SGPA) by a group of local residents concerned with ongoing traprock quarrying on the Giant's head. A cottage owner, Judge Willis Cook, had leased his property  to the Mount Carmel Traprock Company for the purpose of quarrying traprock for building materials. The blasting away of what was a beloved landscape feature resulted in public outrage, well reported by local newspapers at the time. Under the leadership of James W. Toumey, a Yale University forestry professor, the SGPA undertook a ten-year struggle with the traprock operation. The property was purchased by the SGPA in 1933, during the Great Depression, for $30,000; the money was raised through private donations and the property became the Sleeping Giant State Park.

Sleeping Giant State Park was created in 1924, when the SGPA donated 600 acres to the Park and Forest Commission. The state added an additional 65 acres that year, purchased at a cost of $7025.00.

In 1936, the Sleeping Giant Tower was built at the top by the Works Progress Administration. It was listed on the National Register of Historic Places in 1986 as part of the Connecticut State Park and Forest Depression-Era Federal Work Relief Programs Structures.

On May 15, 2018, a severe microburst caused significant damage to the park, forcing officials to close the park for an unspecified period of time. The damage was initially assumed to be from a tornado, but the National Weather Serviced determined that the tornado ended just west of Sleeping Giant State Park and had transitioned to a 100-mph microburst by the time it reached the park. The microburst was half a mile wide and continued for seven miles. Nearly every pine tree in the main picnic area was toppled. After more than a year of clean up, the park finally reopened on June 14, 2019.

Recreation
Sleeping Giant State Park is a popular outdoor recreation destination among residents and visitors of the greater New Haven region. The clifftops offer long views of much of New Haven County and some of Hartford County over more than 270 degrees of the compass, and (atmospheric conditions permitting) across Long Island Sound to the Shoreham area on Long Island.

The state park is open until sunset year-round. During warm weather months, a parking fee is charged on weekends and holidays ($4 to $15 in 2016). Activities permitted on the Giant include hiking, rock climbing, snowshoeing, picnicking, bird watching, and other passive pursuits. Trails specifically designed for horseback riding and cross-country skiing are located on the lower reaches of the Giant, and fishing is allowed in the abutting Mill River. Rock climbing, closed on the Giant in 1953 because of accidents, was permitted as of 2015. Youth camping only is allowed on the Giant (by permit). Seasonal facilities include restrooms, a picnic shelter, and picnic tables. The  Quinnipiac Trail—the oldest trail in the  blue blazed trail system managed by the Connecticut Forest and Park Association—traverses the length of the Giant from the Quinnipiac River west over the Giant's high points to the Mill River then continues north over West Rock Ridge and Mount Sanford.

Conservation
Most, but not all, of the Sleeping Giant has been conserved. The trails and facilities on Sleeping Giant are collaboratively maintained by the Sleeping Giant Park Association and the State of Connecticut, with the bulk of the trail maintenance done by the association. Sleeping Giant State Park encompasses ; the SGPA remains active in securing additional parcels to add to the property. The SGPA has also been instrumental in defeating attempts to log the Giant, build communications towers on its summits, and close the state park altogether. SGPA runs a regular recreational and interpretive hikes on the Giant and volunteer trail maintenance programs. The Connecticut Forest and Park Association also has a working investment in the conservation of the Giant and trail building on it.

See also
 
 Metacomet Ridge
 National Register of Historic Places listings in New Haven County, Connecticut
 Old Man of Hoy, a rock pillar off Scotland that resembles a standing man
 Old Man of the Mountain, a face that used to stand out from a cliff in New Hampshire
 Quinnipiac River
 Quinnipiac Trail
 Sleeping Giant (Kauai)
 Sleeping Giant (Ontario)
 West Rock Ridge State Park
 Adjacent summits:

References

External links

Sleeping Giant State Park Connecticut Department of Energy and Environmental Protection
Sleeping Giant State Park Map Connecticut Department of Energy and Environmental Protection
Sleeping Giant Park Association
Sleeping Giant Trail Map (color) Sleeping Giant Park Association
Sleeping Giant Trail Map (b&w) Sleeping Giant Park Association
Sleeping Giant Cross-country Ski Trail Map Sleeping Giant Park Association

Hiking trails in Connecticut
Tourist attractions in New Haven County, Connecticut
Geography of New Haven County, Connecticut
Mountains of Connecticut
National Register of Historic Places in New Haven County, Connecticut
State parks of Connecticut
Metacomet Ridge, Connecticut
Climbing areas of the United States
Landforms of New Haven County, Connecticut
Hamden, Connecticut
Wallingford, Connecticut
Parks in New Haven County, Connecticut
Towers in Connecticut
Works Progress Administration in Connecticut
Protected areas established in 1924
1924 establishments in Connecticut
Buildings and structures on the National Register of Historic Places in Connecticut